Revolver Soul is a studio album by the band Alabama 3. It is the first album by the band to be released through Hostage Music, after parting ways with One Little Indian Records. It was recorded at Jamm Studios, in Brixton.

Track listing 
"[intro] Oh Christ" – 3:37
"Bad To The Bone" – 3:15
"She Blessed Me" – 3:38
"Jacqueline" – 3:13
"Fix It" – 4:32 featuring Shane MacGowan
"Bad Girl" – 4:15
"If I Had A Diamond Ring" – 0:36
"Hostage" – 3:48
"Keep Your Powder Dry" – 4:28
"Come Ye Believers" – 0:57
"Vietnamistan" – 4:43
"All God's Children" – 3:36
"Revolver Soul" – 5:46
"[outro] Oh Christ" – 1:38

Notes 
The title is a reference to The Beatles albums Revolver and Rubber Soul. "Vietnamistan" contains samples of "Yankee Doodle Dandy" and "I-Feel-Like-I'm-Fixin'-to-Die-Rag" by Country Joe & the Fish.

References 

2010 albums
Alabama 3 albums